Aenigmabonus is a genus of very small, deep water sea snails, marine gastropod mollusks in the family Bathyphytophilidae, the false limpets.

Species
Species within the genus Aenigmabonus include:
 Aenigmabonus kurilokamtschaticus Moskalev, 1978

References

External links
 To ITIS
 To World Register of Marine Species

Bathyphytophilidae
Monotypic gastropod genera